The dinar was the currency of Sudan between 1992 and 2007. Its ISO 4217 code was "SDD" and had no official subdivision. It replaced the first Sudanese pound and, in turn, was replaced by the second Sudanese pound.

History
The dinar replaced the first Sudanese pound  (SDP) on June 8, 1992, at a rate of SD 1 = £S.10. On January 10, 2007, a second Sudanese pound (SDG) was introduced at a rate of 1 pound = 100 dinars. According to the Bank of Sudan, the dinar was to have stopped circulating after a six-month transitional period. The pound and the dinar were to be accepted as legal currency side by side during the six-month period but cheques would be cashed in pounds from the commercial banks. The Bank of Sudan began distributing the new currency to commercial banks and sent consignments of banknotes to the south in 2007. This second Sudanese pound became the only legal tender as of July 1, 2007.

Coins
Coins were minted in denominations of SD , SD , SD 1, SD 2, SD 5, SD 10, SD 20 and SD 50 (the two smallest denominations appear to have been shelved before being issued). A reduction in size took place, with the 2001-03 coins being generally smaller than the 1994-99 coins. A source indicates that bi-metallic SD 50 and SD 100 coins were planned but that this plan was shelved because of the introduction of the second pound. See below for more detail.

Banknotes
Banknotes were issued in denominations of SD 5, SD 10, SD 25, SD 50, SD 100, SD 200, SD 500, SD 1,000, SD 2,000 and SD 5,000. The lowest three denominations were withdrawn on 1 January 2000 due to a concern that well-used notes could spread disease. Old pound notes also circulated alongside dinar notes.

Historical exchange rates
Rate against US$1995–2004.
(See historical rates)

See also

 Economy of Sudan

References

External links
 The banknotes of Sudan (Sudanese dinar) 
 The banknotes of Sudan (Sudanese pound) 

Economy of Sudan
Modern obsolete currencies
1992 establishments in Sudan
2007 disestablishments in Sudan